Delazi (also Romanized as Defazi; also known as Dīlazī) is a village in Shepiran Rural District of Kuhsar District of Salmas County, West Azerbaijan province, Iran. At the 2006 National Census, its population was 2,020 in 310 households. The following census in 2011 counted 2,230 people in 412 households. The latest census in 2016 showed a population of 2,039 people in 412 households; it was the largest village in its rural district.

References 

Salmas County

Populated places in West Azerbaijan Province

Populated places in Salmas County